Puig Sesarques is a mountain of Catalonia, Spain. It has an elevation of 880 metres above sea level.

See also
Mountains of Catalonia

References

Mountains of Catalonia